Kosmos 10 ( meaning Cosmos 10), also known as Zenit-2 No.5, was a Soviet reconnaissance satellite launched in 1962. It was the tenth satellite to be designated under the Kosmos system, and the fourth successful launch of a Soviet reconnaissance satellite, following Kosmos 4, Kosmos 7 and Kosmos 9.

Spacecraft
Kosmos 10 was a Zenit-2 satellite, a first generation, low resolution, reconnaissance satellite derived from the Vostok spacecraft used for crewed flights, the satellites were developed by OKB-1. In addition to reconnaissance, it was also used for research into radiation in support of the Vostok programme.

Mission
The Vostok-2, s/n T15000-03, was used to launch Kosmos 10. The launch was conducted from Site 1/5 at the Baikonur Cosmodrome, and occurred at 09:21 GMT on 21 October 1962. It conducted a four-day mission, before being deorbited and landing by parachute on 21 October 1962, and recovered by the Soviet forces in the steppe in Kazakhstan.

It was the last four-day test flight of the Zenit-2 programme, before the system became fully operational and began making eight-day full-duration flights from the next mission, Kosmos 12.

See also

 1962 in spaceflight

References

Spacecraft launched in 1962
1962 in the Soviet Union
Kosmos satellites
Spacecraft which reentered in 1962